Radical 36 or radical evening meaning "evening" or "sunset" is one of the 31 Kangxi radicals (214 radicals total) composed of three strokes.

In the Kangxi Dictionary, there are 34 characters (out of 49,030) to be found under this radical.

 is also the 43rd indexing component in the Table of Indexing Chinese Character Components predominantly adopted by Simplified Chinese dictionaries published in mainland China.

Evolution

Derived characters

Literature

External links

Unihan Database - U+5915

036
043